The University School of Milwaukee (often abbreviated to USM) is an independent pre-kindergarten through secondary preparatory school in River Hills and Milwaukee, Wisconsin. It was founded as the result of the merger of three schools, Milwaukee Country Day School, Milwaukee Downer Seminary, and Milwaukee University School. USM is accredited by the Independent Schools Association of the Central States and is a member of the National Association of Independent Schools (NAIS).

History
Milwaukee University School, the oldest of the three schools that merged as University School of Milwaukee, was founded in 1851 as the German-English Academy by a group of Milwaukee German Americans that included  Peter Engelmann and hardware wholesaler William Frankfurth. The Academy offered classes that taught the German language and literature, as well as English. In 1891, the academy moved to the German-English Academy Building in downtown Milwaukee. The institution changed its name in 1917 to Milwaukee University School because of anti-German prejudice that occurred during World War I.

In 1964, the Milwaukee University School, the Milwaukee Country Day School and Milwaukee-Downer Seminary merged to become the University School of Milwaukee. It operated from two campuses, North and South, one in Whitefish Bay and the other in River Hills. In 1985, the two combined into one campus at the River Hills location, serving students from pre-kindergarten through twelfth grade.

Lawsuit
On Monday, April 18, 2022, Craig and Kelly Robinson filed a civil lawsuit alleging that "the school acted impermissibly to silence and to retaliate against those adversely affected by, and raising concerns about, the school's unfair treatment of students of color and underrepresented students." Earlier, the couple had given feedback towards the school based on racial and ethnic stereotypes in classroom assignments. Their children, then 9 and 11, were later removed from enrollment at the school.  Craig Robinson stated, "We feel like they were retaliated against because we brought up some issues that were sensitive to the administration." The school issued a statement responding to the allegations, "USM's enrollment decisions had nothing to do with complaints of inequity or discrimination." More families later came out with allegations of discrimination.

Athletics
The school's athletic teams follow a no-cut athletic policy, which allows every student to participate in any sport. The athletic program begins in fifth grade, when students become eligible for a number of teams, including basketball, track and field, football and several intramural sports. The Middle School offers 13 interscholastic sports and intramural options. The Upper School has 24 varsity teams level sports, in addition to a number of junior varsity programs.

Notable alumni
Rakesh "Raj" Bhala, international trade law and Islamic law expert and professor at the University of Kansas
Raj Chetty, professor of economics at Harvard University
Adam Ciralsky, journalist, television and film producer, and attorney
James Graaskamp, professor of real estate analysis and appraisal
Carl Holty, painter
Bob Jake, basketball player and physician
William Kasik, businessman and member of the Wisconsin State Assembly
Robert Koehler, artist and teacher
Von Mansfield, football player
Lane MacDonald, hockey player
Sue Mingus, record producer and band manager
George Rathmann, chemist and biotechnology executive, (co-founder of Amgen)
Henry Reuss, member of Congress
Mark Rylance, Academy Award winner for best supporting actor; stage director
Wendy Selig-Prieb, businesswoman, former president of the Milwaukee Brewers
James Sensenbrenner, member of Congress
Erich C. Stern, lawyer and Wisconsin State Representative
August Uihlein, brewer and later owner of the Joseph Schlitz Brewing Company
Neal Ulevich, photojournalist, Pulitzer Prize winner
D.A. Wallach, musician and business executive
Sarah P. L. Wolffe, Lady Wolffe, Outer House Senator of the College of Justice of Scotland
Bill Zito, general manager of the Florida Panthers

References

External links

High schools in Milwaukee
Educational institutions established in 1851
Private high schools in Wisconsin
Private middle schools in Wisconsin
Private elementary schools in Wisconsin
Preparatory schools in Wisconsin
1851 establishments in Wisconsin